Georgetown is an unincorporated community in Carroll County, Illinois, United States. Georgetown is located on Illinois Route 72 and Illinois Route 73, north of Lanark.

References

Unincorporated communities in Carroll County, Illinois
Unincorporated communities in Illinois